Lewis Martin (born 8 April 1996) is a Scottish footballer who plays as a defender for Kelty Hearts. Martin has previously played for Dunfermline Athletic and also represented Scotland at Under-19 level.

Club career
Born in Bonnybridge on the outskirts of Falkirk, Martin started his footballing career with Rangers youth squads from under-10s level, before moving to Dunfermline Athletic at the age of sixteen. He made his first team debut during the 2012–13 season as a 90th-minute substitute against Scottish First Division opponents Greenock Morton, after the club encountered financial problems resulting in the redundancy of seven first team players. Martin then made his first full start in December 2013 in a league match against Ayr United and was a semi-permanent starter for the remainder of the 2013–14 season. His first goal for the club came in a one-all draw with Rangers.

During the 2014–15 season, Martin played in every league match for the Pars, bar those where he was called up to the Scotland under-19 squad. The 2015–16 season began in much the same way, with Martin starting the first thirteen competitive matches. However, after being involved in a car accident at the end of September, Martin missed the matches against Albion Rovers and St Mirren before returning to the starting eleven in a 3–0 win against Stranraer.

After undergoing groin surgery in August 2018, which was expected to keep him out for six weeks, Martin missed almost the entire 2018–19 season, returning for Dunfermline's penultimate league match of the season against Greenock Morton.

Martin eventually returned during the 2021/22 season after overcoming numerous injury setbacks. Following Dunfermline's relegation to League One, Martin's contract was not renewed and he left the club after ten years.

International career
In August 2014, Martin was called up for the Scotland under-19 squad to face Belgium in a friendly match in Tubize, making his debut as a second-half substitute, replacing Blackburn Rovers defender Sam Lavelle. His first full start for the side was against Norway in a qualification match for the UEFA European Under-19 Championship, in a one-all draw which saw the side miss out on automatic qualification to the elite round of qualification. In total, Martin made four appearances for the under-19 side.

Career statistics

Honours

Club
Dunfermline Athletic
Scottish League One: 2015–16

References

External links

1996 births
Living people
Scottish footballers
Association football defenders
Scottish Football League players
Dunfermline Athletic F.C. players
Scottish Professional Football League players
Kelty Hearts F.C. players